Ma is a Sumerian word meaning "land" that in Sumerian mythology was also used to regard Primordial Land.  

There seems to be some loss in records as to the transition, but the same name Ma appears again later, also tied to the Earth, in Ma being referred to as "Mother of the mountain" - in this case, Kur (Mountain) the first dragon god.  

The underworld Kur is the void space between the primeval sea (Abzu) and the earth (Ma).

References
Pagans and Christians (1988) by Robin Lane Fox, page 536 
 this source below is not related, taken out of context:Ma (goddess) – entry in Encyclopædia Britannica 
History of Art in Phrygia, Lydia, Caria and Lycia (2007) by George Perrot, page 30  

Locations in Mesopotamian mythology
Sumer
Mesopotamian gods
Creator goddesses
Mother goddesses
Earth goddesses
Mountain goddesses
Sumerian words and phrases